Nicholas S. Hashu (February 1, 1917 – April 28, 2012) was an American professional basketball player. He played in the National Basketball League for the Hammond Ciesar All-Americans and Chicago American Gears. He averaged 2.2 points per game.

References 

1917 births
2012 deaths
American men's basketball players
Basketball players from Indiana
Centers (basketball)
Chicago American Gears players
Forwards (basketball)
Hammond Ciesar All-Americans players
Michigan State Spartans men's basketball players
Sportspeople from Hammond, Indiana
Valparaiso Beacons men's basketball players